Unichem Laboratories was founded in 1944 by Padmabhushan Late Mr. Amrut V Mody, a pioneer in the Indian pharmaceuticals business.

History 
The initial public offering of Unichem Laboratories Limited was in 1963, after its registration in 1962, and the company was consequently listed on BSE Limited and NSE Limited.

It is one of India's oldest and largest pharmaceutical companies, headquartered in Mumbai, Maharashtra, India. It manufactures and markets pharmaceutical formulations across the globe, including the regulated markets of the US and Europe.

Unichem Laboratories Limited is currently active in finished formulations, APIs, contract manufacturing, custom synthesis, etc. Their R & D site at Goa has expertise in product development, process chemistry and developing complex APIs for global market.

Operations 
Unichem's Formulations manufacturing facilities are located at Goa, Ghaziabad (Uttar Pradesh) and Baddi (Himachal Pradesh). Active Pharmaceutical Ingredient (API) manufacturing facilities are located at Roha (Maharashtra), Pithampur (Madhya Pradesh) and Kolhapur (Maharashtra). Goa, Ghaziabad, Roha, Pithampur and Kolhapur sites are USFDA approved and all the plants are approved from other major health authorities.

The Company's facilities have been approved by various International health authorities such as USFDA, UK MHRA, ANVISA (Brazil), COFEPRIS (Mexico), PMDA (Japan), TGA (Australia), SAPHRA (South Africa) and MFDS(Korea), EDQM (European Directorate for the Quality of Medicines), TPD (Canada).

Research and Development 
The Company has set up a Research & Development Centre at Goa.
The R&D Centre concentrates on developing NDDS for generic APIs and NCEs, reverse engineering the API processes, drug discovery and bio catalysis. The Company has strategic alliances with global players for CRAMS and other projects. 
The Company has a functional Biotech R&D Centre and a Pilot Plant at Goa. Bio-similar R&D is based on recombinant DNA platform. Microbial fermentation and protein purification are its strengths.  The cell culture facility in the Biotech R&D is capable of handling mammalian cell lines for screening novel biological and chemical entities.

The Company has made more than 500 product registrations across the world. It has more than 70 US ANDA filings, 45 approved ANDAs and more than 60 European submissions. The Company holds 75 US DMF, 26 Certificate of suitability to European Pharmacopeia (CEP) issued by the European Directorate for the Quality of Medicines and Healthcare (EDQM) and several DMFs across the world.

References 

1.    "Unichem, Optimus enter into strategic tie-up”. The Hindu Business Line.com. Published on 5 November 2018.

2.    “Unichem to acquire 20% stake in Optimus group for Rs 120 cr”. Business-standard.com. Published on 5 November 2018.

3.    “Unichem Labs gets USFDA nod for asthma drug”. Economictimes.com. Published on 4-July-2018.

4.    “Unichem Labs' Ghaziabad unit gets EIR from USFDA” Thebusinessline.com. Published on 5 June 2018. 2018.

5.    “Unichem Laboratories Gets ANDA Approval from U.S. FDA for Valsartan Tablets, USP.” Reuters.com. Published on 7 May 2018.

6.    “How Torrent Pharma is integrating Unichem to boost its domestic business.” Business-standard.com. Published on 13 February 2018.

7.    “Torrent Pharma completes acquisition of Unichem Laboratories Ltd.” Economictimes.com. Published on 14 December 2017.

8.     “This conventional businessman is set for second innings”. Economictimes.indiatimes.com. Published on 4 November 2017.

9.     “Unichem Labs gets EIR from USFDA for Goa facility” Economics times.com. Published on 30 June 2017.

10.  "Unichem Lab appoints Mr. Bhagwat S. Dhingra as Chief Executive-Domestic Pharma". Moneycontrol.com. 13 August 2012.

11.  "Contact Pharmaceutical Company India - Unichem Laboratories". Unichemlabs.com. Retrieved 3 October 2010.

12.  "Interview of Dr P A Mody, CEO, Unichem Laboratories Ltd". Indiainfoline.com. Retrieved 3 October 2010.

13.  "BSE Plus". Bseindia.com. Retrieved 3 October 2010.

14.  "Pharmaceutical Business, Pharma Business Development - Unichem Laboratories". Unichemlabs.com. Retrieved 3 October 2010.

15.  "Indian pharma firms swallow bitter pill in US, Europe". Business Standard. 16 July 2009. Retrieved 3 October 2010.

16.  "Buy Unichem Laboratories: Karvy". Moneycontrol.com. Retrieved 3 October 2010.

17.  "Unichem gets EU nod for drug to treat enlarged prostate". The Economic Times. Press Trust of India. 23 September 2010. Retrieved 3 October 2010.

18.  "Unichem Laboratories receives CEP for Alfuzosin Hydrochloride". The Financial Express. 23 September 2010. Retrieved 3 October 2010.

19.  "Unichem Labs". Buci.org. Retrieved 3 October 2010.

20.   “Info on Company management”. Management. Economictimes.indiatimes.com.

Companies based in Mumbai
Pharmaceutical companies of India
Pharmaceutical companies established in 1944
Indian companies established in 1944
Indian brands
Companies listed on the Bombay Stock Exchange
Indian companies established in 1962
1960s initial public offerings